John Maughan (born 1962) is an Irish Gaelic football manager and former player who most recently managed the Offaly football team.

He is a former manager of the Mayo, Clare, Roscommon and Fermanagh senior football teams. He is only the third man to lead five different counties and the first to complete a "slam", with at least one of these counties coming from each of Ireland's four provinces.

Early life
Maughan is originally from Crossmolina. He comes from a family of six children. He was the only one sent to boarding school, which he attended at Moate's Carmelite College. After school he joined the Irish Army. He is a graduate of University College Galway. He attended the university in the early 1980s.

Army Career

Maughan was an offer in the Irish Army from 1979 to 1999. He reached the rank of Captain and was based in Renmore Barracks Dún Uí Mhaoilíosa in Galway. When he was appointed to the Mayo job, he commuted from Cyprus for the first couple of games as he was serving with the United Nations.

Playing career
Maughan won a Hogan Cup medal with Moate's Carmelite College in 1980. He also won two Sigerson Cups with University College Galway in the early 1980s. This, alongside a spell with the Mayo under-21 team, led to Maughan being called up to the senior county team. Surgery on his knee cartilage in 1986 led to the end of his days as a player. He had four more operations but on the knee cartilage but was informed three years later that he could no longer play at inter-county level. He continued to play locally, switching base in 1994 and transferring to Castlebar Mitchels in the expectation of getting to play junior football but was a runner-up in that year's Mayo Senior Football Championship final. In a 1995 Mayo Senior Football Championship quarter-final Maughan sustained a broken jaw. After being brought to Dublin's Mater Hospital, a story in a newspaper led to bother as he had flown back from Cyprus where he was on peacekeeping duty with the Irish Army.

Coaching career
Mayo's manager when Maughan's playing days ended was John O'Mahony. O'Mahony retained Maughan's services as a team physical trainer.

A call came from Clare GAA one evening to ask if Maughan would become coach for the 1990 season. Discovering that no manager had yet been appointed Maughan asked if he could take the post. He did so, at the age of 28. Eleven players attended Maughan's first training session in Crusheen.

He led Clare to the 1992 Munster Senior Football Championship.

After finishing as Clare manager, Maughan went to Cyprus for United Nations peacekeeping duty in Nicosia.

He was appointed manager of the Mayo county team while still based in Cyprus and commuted for several games at the start of his spell in charge.

He led his native county to the successive All-Ireland Senior Football Championship final defeats in 1996, 1997. He returned for a second spell in charge and led his native county to a further All-Ireland Senior Football Championship final defeat in 2004.

In between his spells with Mayo, he had a short stint as Fermanagh manager (winning an All-Ireland 'B' Football Championship) and, after taking charge of Mayo for the second time, he was manager of Roscommon. He resigned as Roscommon manager in the spring of 2008.

He commuted from his home in Castlebar to manage Offaly. Maughan announced his departure as Offaly manager in July 2022 after a four-year spell in charge during which he achieved promotion for Offaly to Division 2 of the National Football League (though relegation to Division 3 followed the next year) and advanced to the semi-final of the inaugural 2022 Tailteann Cup.

Maughan has also led NUI Galway GAA.

Personal life
Maughan is married to Audrey, and lives in Castlebar. He is a grandfather. He had surgery on his back in 2019.

As of 2021, he was working as a Procurement Officer at Mayo County Council, while, as of 2019, Maughan is a member of the board of Sport Ireland.

Though fully-vaccinated, Maughan isolated at his home in Enniscrone after contracting COVID-19 in 2021 (his sense of taste and smell he said were "completely gone").

References

External links
GAA Info Profile

1962 births
Living people
Alumni of the University of Galway
Castlebar Mitchels Gaelic footballers
Crossmolina Gaelic footballers
Coaches of Gaelic football teams at Irish universities
Gaelic football managers
Irish Army personnel
Mayo Gaelic footballers
University of Galway Gaelic footballers
Sport Ireland officials
People from Crossmolina